Kim Chan-Young (born 1 April 1989) is a South Korean footballer.

Career
He joined Mokpo City in 2011 and made 20 appearances for the team before moving to Japan.

In 2014, he returned to his homeland and signed with Busan IPark.

References

External links 

1989 births
Living people
Association football defenders
South Korean footballers
South Korean expatriate sportspeople in Japan
South Korean expatriate footballers
Busan IPark players
Korea National League players
K League 1 players
Expatriate footballers in Japan
Kyung Hee University alumni